Thodasa Roomani Ho Jayen is a 1990 Hindi movie directed by Amol Palekar. It features Anita Kanwar, Nana Patekar and Vikram Gokhale as major actors. This movie has become a part of management courses and study pertaining to human behaviour.

Plot 
The movie has a lot of poetry within itself. Anita Kanwar is an unconventional girl lacking confidence. All people around her including her father and brothers keep advising her "how she should be". Then, a magician who can bring rain comes to their lives. He helps her to realize the potential of believing. He brings back beauty and confidence to her. Now, she realizes altogether a different life, just because of believing or changing perception.

The theme of the movie is also said to be inspired by the critically acclaimed The Rainmaker (play) written by N. Richard Nash.

Cast
Anita Kanwar
Nana Patekar
Vikram Gokhale

Critical reception 
The film was featured in Avijit Ghosh's book, 40 Retakes: Bollywood Classics You May Have Missed.

Details 
The movie was shot in Pachmarhi in Madhya Pradesh.

References

External links 
 

1990s Hindi-language films
1990 films
Films directed by Amol Palekar